Todd Gully is a valley about 0.7 nautical miles (1.3 km) west of Brock Gully in the Allan Hills, Oates Land. Reconnoitered by the New Zealand Antarctic Research Program (NZARP) Allan Hills Expedition (1964) who named it after the dialect name for a fox because of the resemblance to fox country in parts of England.

References

Valleys of Oates Land